Football Club Kairat is a professional football club based in Almaty, which plays in the Kazakhstan Premier League, the highest level of Kazakh football. Founded in 1954 as Lokomotiv Alma-Ata, they became Urozhay in 1955 and Kairat in 1956. The club's home ground is the Central Stadium which has a capacity of 23,804. The club's home kit colours are yellow and black striped shirts, black shorts and black socks.

Kairat was the leading Kazakh club during the Soviet period and the only representative of the Kazakh Soviet Socialist Republic in the Soviet Top League. For this, Kairat became nicknamed The Nation's Team, and remains to be widely supported all over the country. All in all, the club spent 24 seasons in the Soviet highest level. They also won Soviet First League titles twice in 1976 and 1983. During this period, Kairat was a part of the Voluntary Sports Societies of the Soviet Union.

In modern history, Kairat won three league titles, eight Kazakhstan Cups and two Kazakhstan Super Cups. The club's strongest rivalry is FC Astana, among fans their matches are considered as the Two Capitals Derby.

History

Founding 

The club was founded in 1954 as Lokomotiv Alma-Ata on the basis of the football club Dinamo Alma-Ata. Heretofore, Dinamo was developed by Nikolai Starostin, who is mostly known as "the father of Soviet football" and founder of the Spartak Moscow. His assistant Arkady Khokhman became the first head coach of the club. Lokomotiv joined Zone I of the Class B, the second tier of Soviet football. In their debut season, they finished 4th with 11 wins, 7 draws and 4 defeats. In 1955, they were reformed as Urozhay Sports Society, which united sportsmen of agricultural sphere. In 1955, Urozhay competed in Zone II of the Class B, finishing season in 10th place. On 1 June 1956, the Council of Ministers of the Kazakh SSR signed a decree about merger of the Urozhay Sports Society and Republican Sports Society of Collective Farmers to found new Republican Rural Voluntary Sports Society. Thereafter, Kazakh sports governing body proposed to adopt new name in recognition of the merger. Suggested names included Yeginshi (Cultivator), Tulpar (Phoenix), Onim (Harvest), Altyn Dan (Golden Grain), Kuresshi (Fighter), Dala Burkiti (Steppe Eagle) and Zhastar (The Youth). On 18 June 1956, plenary session of the Council of Ministers unanimously voted for Kairat (Power), the name missing in proposals, apparently promoted by then the leader of Kazakh SSR Dinmukhamed Kunayev. In July 1956, Pyotr Zenkin appointed as a new head coach. Under Zenkin, Kairat spent four consecutive seasons in the Class B, showing average results on final tables.

The Nation's Team (1960–1991) 

On 21 December 1959, Soviet sports governing body adopted a resolution on expansion of Soviet Top League teams number from 12 to 22. Ten Soviet republics were able to enter by one team without competition, permission which was aimed to make league status more "All-Union". Kazakh side gave a spot to Kairat, who had strong lobbying from the country administration. On 10 April 1960, they played their first competitive match in the league against Admiralteyets Leningrad, with a score of 0–0. On 13 May 1960, Kairat registered their first Top League victory defeating Dinamo Minsk 2–1 in away match. During the season, tactical scheme of Kairat caused a lot of discussion among football specialists. Team manager Nikolay Glebov adopted 4–2–4 and 4–3–3 formations, so-called Brazilian schemes, previously not used by Soviet teams. As a result, team playing style became strictly defensive. For this, Soviet press and fans nicknamed team defense "Kairat Concrete", an epithet which was associated with the club during the next decades. In spite of this, weaknesses in the offensive part and a poor goal scoring rate led only to 18th place in their inaugural season in the top level.

Kairat stayed at the top level for another three seasons. In 1963, Kairat did their best result in the Soviet Cup, reaching semi-final against Shakhtar Stalino. For this accomplishment, all team members were equated the Master of Sport of the USSR rank. After failure season in 1964, they relegated to the Soviet First League. On 25 November 1965, they played the decisive match against Ararat Yerevan for only spot in the Top League. Kairat lost the game 1–2. However, this day teams managers took a telegram from Football Federation of USSR about decision on promotion of both clubs, an information hidden from players until the end of the match. Kairat dropped once again to the First League at the end of the 1969 season under the management of Andrey Chen Ir Son. Chen Ir Son was replaced by Aleksandr Sevidov. He steered Kairat back to the Top League, finishing as runners-up in the 1970 Soviet First League season. Next season, Sevidov left the team to head Dynamo Kiev.

The 1971 season was highly successful for the club. Under Viktor Korolkov rule, Kairat finished 8th in the Top League, a significant increase compared to previous seasons. On 12 November 1971, Kairat won the European Railworks Cup, defeating Rapid Bucharest 2–1 in the final. This achievement made Kairat the first Soviet team to win a European tournament. In subsequent two seasons, the club kept its registry in the Top League. In 1974, under Artyom Falyan Kairat finished the season in 15th place and they were relegated once more. Next year, new head coach Vsevolod Bobrov could not get a promotion, finishing season 4th. In 1976, under the dual management of Timur Segizbayev and Stanislav Kaminskiy, the club won the Soviet First League and returned to top level. The deuce of head coaches managed the team for the next two years. In the 1977-1978 Top League seasons, Kairat finished 8th and 12th respectively. In the 1979 season, Karat headed by the deuce of Segizbayev and Igor Volchok led the club to 13th place in the league.

In 1980, Igor Volchok, already as a sole head coach, built up the team dominantly consisted of young players. Among them were Yevstafi Pekhlevanidi,
Vakhid Masudov, Anton Shokh, Sergei Volgin, Sergei Ledovskikh and Kurban Berdyev, who became the key players of the club in the 80s. Kairat finished the 1980 season in 12th place with 10 wins, 11 draws and 13 defeats. For the most wins with a comeback, the team won the For the Will of Victory Prize, awarded by the Soviet Russia newspaper. In the 1982 season, under Yozhef Betsa coaching, team results had been sharply declined. Towards the end of the season Betsa was replaced by Leonid Ostroushko. However, he did not have time to rectify the situation and they were relegated to the First League. In the 1986 season, Ostroushko led the club to 7th place, the best result of Kairat in the Soviet Top League. In the 1988 season, under Segizbayev rule, Kairat relegated to the First League once more. Despite this failure the team ended the season with success. On 22 November 1988, Kairat won the USSR Federation Cup. In the final in Kishinev, the club beat Neftchi Baku 4–1, where all four goal scored by Kairat's forward Viktor Karachun. Until the dissolution of the Soviet Union in the end of 1991, Kairat was a member of the First League, season-by-season showing decline.

First Kazakh champions and secession (1992–2000) 

As a result of the subsequent independence of Kazakhstan, Kairat joined the newly formed Kazakhstan Premier League. Being the strongest Kazakh club at that time, Kairat was chosen as a base club to form the Kazakhstan national football team. Therefore, the club manager Bakhtiyar Baiseitov also headed the national team. In the inaugural season of the league, the club became champion. They also reached their first double, winning Fosfor Taraz in the 1992 Kazakhstan Cup Final.

Next season, Kairat records deteriorated sharply. The 11th place in the 1993 season led to dismissal of Baiseitov. Following two seasons, under management of former Kairat player Kurban Berdyev Kairat finished 11th and 9th. In 1997, another Kairat veteran Vakhid Masudov led the team to their second Kazakhstan Cup success. In the end of the season, Kairat had financial troubles due to financial crisis in the country. The Ministry of Defense of Kazakhstan decided to become a main sponsor and take the team under its wing. However, the half of the team did not agree with the decision to be under military control. As a result of disagreement, Kairat was divided into two teams, Kairat Sports and Health Professional Football Club, shortly Kairat SHPFC, and Kairat-CSKA, who took sponsorship of the state military body. The last got a right to Premier League register, while Kairat SHPFC went to Kazakhstan First Division. In the 1998 season, Kairat SHPFC found a sponsorship from Kazakh businessman Bulat Abilov, whose support led to Kazakhstan First Division win and promotion to Premier League. The next two seasons marked the participation of both Kairats in the league. The fully crowded Central Stadium hosted their matches against each other and caused great interest but also contradictions among the fans. In 2000, Kairat SHPFC won the Kazakhstan Cup, beating 5–0 Access-Golden Grain in the final.

Reunification, the second title and stagnation (2001–2009) 
On 1 March 2001, Almaty Deputy Mayor Kairat Bukenov announced the reunification of two clubs. Already as unified Kairat, they won two Kazakhstan Cups, in 2001 and 2003. In 2004, under the Aleksei Petrushin rule the club won their second domestic title.

At the end of the 2006 season, the main sponsor of the club Kazakhstan Temir Zholy, withdrew. This precipitated a financial troubles which lasted until the start of 2007 season. Consequently, most of the club's players switched to other teams. The club entered the 2007 season with an inexperienced, young team. In July 2007, a group of private investors took over the club and invested around 4 million US dollars in it. At the beginning of 2009, the club declared itself bankrupt and was relegated to the First Division. In November 2009, Kairat became the champion of the First Division and returned to top-flight.

Recent years (2010–present)
On 15 October 2018, Carlos Alós left Kairat by mutual consent, with Andrei Karpovich being appointed as Caretaker manager.
On 25 November 2018, Kairat presented Aleksey Shpilevsky as their new manager. On 7 June 2021, Aleksey Shpilevsky left Kairat to join Erzgebirge Aue. On 24 August 2021, Kurban Berdyev was appointed manager of the Kazakhstan Premier League club FC Kairat. Berdyev left Kairat by mutual consent on 6 June 2022. Kirill Keker was appointed as the clubs permanent Head Coach two days later on 8 June 2022.

Stadium 

In their earlier years, Kairat played their home games at the Spartak Stadium. Building of the club's present ground Almaty Central Stadium started in 1956. The initiator of the building was the then leader of the Kazakh SSR Leonid Brezhnev. The location for the stadium in the square surrounded by Abay, Baitursynov, Satpayev streets and the Yesentai River was chosen by Brezhnev himself. Architect Adambay Kapanov took the Luzhniki Stadium in Moscow as a model for the new stadium. Being smaller than Luzhniki, the stadium later was nicknamed as the Small Luzhniki. The arena was also projected with running track and the number of elements for athletic events. The Central Stadium was commissioned in 1958. However, the first official match was held here on 10 April 1960. On this day, Kairat played their debut match in the Soviet Top League against Admiralteyets Leningrad, which ended with a score of 0–0. Initially, the stadium benches seated around 35,000 people. In 1997, the stadium was renovated. As a result of old wood benches being replaced by individual plastic chairs, the capacity was reduced to 23,804 seats.

During the Soviet period, the Central stadium was a state property. After independence of Kazakhstan, the stadium was owned by the City Council of Almaty. In 2015, the stadium was transferred to the ownership of Kairat for exchange of 30% of shares of the club.

Players

First-team squad

Out on loan

Other players under contract

For recent transfers, see 2021 FC Kairat season.

Non-playing staff

Management

Coaching staff

Notable managers 

The following managers won at least one trophy when in charge of Kairat:

Honours 

Kazakhstan Premier League
Winners (3): 1992, 2004, 2020
Kazakhstan First Division
Winners (1): 2009
Soviet First League
Winners (2): 1976, 1983
Kazakhstan Cup
Winners (10): 1992, 1996–97, 1999–2000, 2001, 2003, 2014, 2015, 2017, 2018, 2021 (record)
Kazakhstan Super Cup 
Winners (2): 2016, 2017
USSR Federation Cup
Winners (1): 1988

Statistics

Recent seasons 

The season-by-season performance of the club over the last ten years:

Key
Rank = Rank in the league; P = Played; W = Win; D = Draw; L = Loss; F = Goals for; A = Goals against; GD = Goal difference; Pts = Points; Cup = Kazakhstan Cup; CL = UEFA Champions League; EL = UEFA Europa League; ECL = UEFA Europa Conference League.
in = Still in competition; – = Not attended; 1R = 1st round; 2R = 2nd round; 3R = 3rd round; 1QR = 1st qualifying round; 2QR = 2nd qualifying round; 3QR = 3rd qualifying round; PO = Play-off round; GS = Group stage; R16 = Round of sixteen; QF = Quarter-finals; SF = Semi-finals.

European record 

Until the Football Union of Kazakhstan joined UEFA in 2002, the club took part in the Asian Cup Winners' Cup twice in 1997–98 and 2000–01. On the last occasion, they had their best result reaching the quarterfinal, which was lost to the Iranian Esteghlal by the aggregate score of 0–3.

Legend: GF = Goals For. GA = Goals Against. GD = Goal Difference.

Key
QR = Qualifying round; 1QR = 1st qualifying round; 2QR = 2nd qualifying round; 3QR = 3rd qualifying round; PO = Play-off round.

UEFA coefficient 

The following list ranks the current position of Kairat in UEFA club ranking:

As of July 2021.

Top goalscorers

Partnerships 

  Sporting CP (2015–present)
On 29 January 2015 it was announced that Kairat partnered with the Primeira Liga team Sporting CP to cooperate in terms of exchange of skills and knowledge, scouting and training camps for the Kairat Academy players in the Sporting CP Youth and Academy.

References

External links 

  
 FC Kairat on UEFA.com
 

 
1954 establishments in the Kazakh Soviet Socialist Republic
Football clubs in Kazakhstan
Football clubs in Almaty
Association football clubs established in 1954
Soviet Top League clubs
Railway association football teams